4,4’-Dichlorobenzophenone is an organic compound with the formula of (ClC6H4)2CO.

Synthesis
4,4’-Dichlorobenzophenone is prepared by the acylation of chlorobenzene with 4-chlorobenzoyl chloride. The conversion is typically conducted in the presence of an aluminium chloride catalyst in a petroleum ether solvent.
ClC6H5C(O)Cl + C6H5Cl → (ClC6H4)2CO + HCl

References

Chlorobenzenes
Benzophenones